The Wissenschaftliche Buchgesellschaft (WBG) is a German publishing house in Darmstadt. With about 140,000 subscribers (as of 1999) it is one of the largest book clubs in Germany.

German scientists founded the WBG in 1949 as a voluntary association to help with the shortage of scientific literature after World War II. Its aim was to publish new books and to reprint standard works, scarce in that era. The company's principal founder and first managing director was Ernst Anrich. One of its founding members was the philosopher .

Nowadays the WBG publishes works from about 20 fields of study, sent by mail order to its members. About a third of its programme is reprints of other publishers' scientific works.

These publishers belong to the WBG:
 Primus-Verlag, Darmstadt (founded 1996)
 Konrad Theiss Verlag, Stuttgart (taken over 1997)
 Verlag Philipp von Zabern, Mainz (taken over 2005)

See also
 Books in Germany

References 
 Wissenschaftliche Buchgesellschaft, Darmstadt: 1949 - 1974. Eine kurze Darstellung der 25 Jahre (Wissenschaftliche Buchgesellschaft, Darmstadt: 1949 - 1974. A short account of the 25 years). Darmstadt 1974

External links
 WBG Website
 Interview with the head of the WBG 's editorial office on the 50th anniversary (German)
 Website of the Primus-Verlag

Book publishing companies of Germany
Book clubs
Mass media in Darmstadt